Southland Tales is a 2006 dystopian black 
comedy thriller film written and directed by Richard Kelly. It features an ensemble cast that includes Dwayne Johnson, Seann William Scott, Sarah Michelle Gellar, Mandy Moore, and Justin Timberlake. An international co-production of the United States and Germany, the film is set in the then-near future of 2008, and is a portrait of Los Angeles, as well as a satiric commentary on the military–industrial complex and the infotainment industry. The title refers to the Southland, a name used by locals to refer to Southern California and the Greater Los Angeles area. Original music was provided by Moby. 

Southland Tales premiered at the 2006 Cannes Film Festival, and was released theatrically in North America on November 14, 2007, to lukewarm   critical and commercial responses. However, the film developed a cult following in subsequent years. In 2021, Kelly announced that there are developments to expand the film into a franchise.

Synopsis
On July 4th, 2005, in a fictionalized United States alternate history reality, two towns in Texas (El Paso and Abilene) were destroyed by twin nuclear attacks, killing thousands and triggering a catastrophe of unimaginable proportions, sending America into a state of chaos and hysteria, as well as a Third World War (a fictionalized version of what the nation may have become under the War on Terror), with the US government re-introducing the draft.

The PATRIOT Act has extended authority to a new agency known as US-IDent, which keeps constant surveillance on citizens—even to the extent of censoring the Internet and requiring fingerprints to access computers and bank accounts. In response to the recent fuel shortage in the wake of global warfare, the German company Treer designs a generator of inexhaustible energy, which is propelled by the perpetual motion of ocean currents, called "Fluid Karma". However, its inventor Baron von Westphalen and his associates are hiding the fact that the generators alter the ocean's currents and cause the Earth to slow its rotation, and that the transmission of Fluid Karma to portable receivers (via quantum entanglement) is ripping holes in the fabric of space and time.

In near-future 2008, Los Angeles (referred to as "The Southland" by locals) is a dystopian city on the brink of chaos overshadowed by the growth of an underground neo-Marxist organization. The film follows the criss-crossed destinies of Boxer Santaros, an action film actor stricken with amnesia; Krysta Now, a psychic ex–porn star in the midst of creating a reality TV show; and twin brothers Roland and Ronald Taverner, whose destinies become intertwined with that of all mankind. The Taverner twins are revealed to be the same person by the engineers of Treer, duplicated when Roland traveled through a rift in space-time, while Boxer has become the most wanted man in the world despite his political ties and his having the fate of the future, in the form of a prophetic screenplay foretelling the end of the world, in his hands.

Cast
 Dwayne Johnson as Boxer Santaros / Jericho Cane, an amnesiac action star whose life crosses paths with Krysta Now. Santaros is married to Madeline Frost Santaros.
 Seann William Scott as Private Roland Taverner / Officer Ronald Taverner, identical twin brothers, one who is a kidnapped U.P.U.2 officer in Hermosa Beach, California, the other who is working for the neo-Marxist group who have told him he kidnapped and drugged his brother.
 Sarah Michelle Gellar as Krysta Now / Krysta Lynn Kapowski, an adult film star who is working on creating a reality show. Gellar met with Kelly and was drawn to the original ideas in his script for Southland Tales.
 Mandy Moore as Madeline Frost Santaros, Boxer Santaros' wife and daughter of Senator Bobby Frost.
 Justin Timberlake as Private Pilot Abilene, an Iraq War veteran. He narrates the film and also mimes a musical number.
 Miranda Richardson as Nana Mae Frost, the ambitious antagonist of the film, Boxer's mother-in-law is the head of US-IDent.
 Wallace Shawn as Baron von Westphalen, a villain who utilizes ocean waves to create a source of power. He is the great-grandson of Jenny von Westphalen.
 Bai Ling as Serpentine, the Baron's sultry girlfriend who is seen quite often through the film, she serves as an ambiguous character that knows more than she lets on.
 Nora Dunn as Cyndi Pinziki, a porn director and principal member of USIDeath, an organization with plans to destroy US-IDent.
 John Larroquette as Vaughn Smallhouse, an advisor to Senator Bobby Frost.
 Kevin Smith as Simon Theory, a legless Iraq War veteran who works for Baron von Westphalen.

Amy Poehler and Wood Harris appear as Neo-Marxist activists. Zelda Rubinstein and Beth Grant portray Dr. Katarina Kuntzler and Dr. Inga Von Westphalen, members of the baron's entourage. Janeane Garofalo appears as General Teena MacArthur. Cheri Oteri plays Zora Carmichaels, while Jon Lovitz plays violent police officer Bart Bookman who is in love with Zora. Holmes Osborne plays conservative Senator Bobby Frost, Will Sasso plays Fortunio Balducci and Christopher Lambert plays Walter Mung.

Production
Kelly wrote Southland Tales shortly before the September 11 attacks. The original script involved blackmail, a porn star, and two cops. After the attacks, Kelly revised the script. He said, "[The original script] was more about making fun of Hollywood. But now it's about, I hope, creating a piece of science fiction that's about a really important problem we're facing, about civil liberties and homeland security and needing to sustain both those things and balance them." He described the film as a "tapestry of ideas all related to some of the biggest issues that I think we're facing right now . . . alternative fuel or the increasing obsession with celebrity and how celebrity now intertwines with politics". With the film's premise of a nuclear attack on Texas, Kelly wanted to take a look at how the United States would respond and survive while constructing a "great black comedy."

Kelly's breakthrough film, Donnie Darko, was released in the United States on October 26, 2001, the same day the PATRIOT Act was signed. Two months before Southland Tales was released, he announced the launch of Darko Entertainment.

Kelly said: "[Southland Tales] will only be a musical in a post-modern sense of the word in that it is a hybrid of several genres. There will be some dancing and singing, but it will be incorporated into the story in very logical scenarios as well as fantasy dream environments." Kelly said the film's biggest influences are Kiss Me Deadly, Pulp Fiction, Brazil, and Dr. Strangelove. He called it a "strange hybrid of the sensibilities of Andy Warhol and Philip K. Dick". The film often references religious and literary works; a policeman says, "Flow my tears," in reference to a Philip K. Dick novel of that name. ("Taverner" is the name of the main character in the same book and suffers identity problems of his own.) Pilot Abilene (Justin Timberlake) quotes Biblical scripture from the Book of Revelation in narrating the film and allusion is made both to Robert Frost's The Road Not Taken, Stopping by Woods on a Snowy Evening and an altered version of T. S. Eliot's The Hollow Men.

Casting
In March 2004, Kelly and Cherry Road Films began development of Southland Tales. Filmmakers entered negotiations with actors Seann William Scott, Sarah Michelle Gellar, Jason Lee, Janeane Garofalo, Tim Blake Nelson, Amy Poehler, Kevin Smith, and Ali Larter. Musician Moby was approached on composing and performing the film's score. Kelly consciously sought out actors that he felt had been pigeonholed and wanted to showcase their "undiscovered talents."

Filming
Filming was slated to begin in July 2004, but after a year, it had not begun. Dwayne Johnson joined the cast in April 2005, and principal photography was slated to begin August 1, 2005 in Los Angeles. Filming began on August 15, 2005, with a budget of around US$15–17 million.

Post-production
Kelly sent the organizers of the 2006 Cannes Film Festival a rough cut of Southland Tales on DVD assuming that it would not be accepted. Much to his surprise, they loved it and wanted the film entered in competition for the Palme d'Or. He stopped editing the film and was also unable to complete all of the visual effects in time for the screening. Kelly's film premiered at the Cannes Film Festival in May 2006 with a length of 160 minutes. Kelly describes the negative reaction at Cannes as a "very painful experience on a lot of levels" but ultimately felt that the film "was better off because of it". After the film's festival release, Southland Tales was purchased by Sony Pictures (via their label Destination Films) and Samuel Goldwyn Films, originally Sony Pictures Classics, Screen Gems and TriStar Pictures were up for US distribution rights.

Universal Studios had originally optioned the U.S. rights, but after the Cannes screening, it was sold to Sony, although Universal still retained studio credit only and some international distribution rights. Kelly sought more financing to finish visual effects for the film, and he negotiated a deal with Sony to cut down on the film's length in exchange for funds to complete the visual effects.

Kelly edited the film down to the basic storylines of the characters portrayed by Scott, Gellar, and Johnson. The director also sought to keep the musical number performed by Timberlake, based on "All These Things That I've Done" by The Killers which he felt was the heart and soul of the film. Editorial changes were made to restructure the order of the film's scenes, including re-recording all of Timberlake's voice-over. The director also added 90 new visual effects shots to the film and removed 20 to 25 minutes of footage from his initial cut.

Soundtrack

Southland Tales: Music from the Motion Picture is the original soundtrack of Richard Kelly's 2007 film Southland Tales.

 "Wave of Mutilation" (UK surf version) by Pixies
 "Oh My Angel" by Bertha Tillman
 "Howl" (extended version) by Black Rebel Motorcycle Club
 "Look Back In" by Moby
 "Me & Bobby McGee" by Waylon Jennings
 "Chord Sounds" by Moby
 "Lucky Me" by Roger Webb
 "3 Steps" by Moby
 "Broken Hearted Savior" by Big Head Todd and the Monsters
 "Teen Horniness Is Not a Crime" by Sarah Michelle Gellar, Abbey McBride and ClarKent
 "Tiny Elephants" by Moby
 "Forget Myself" by Elbow
 "The Star-Spangled Banner" by Rebekah Del Rio & the Section Quartet
 "Three Days" (live version) by Jane's Addiction
 "Memory Gospel" by Moby

The soundtrack for Southland Tales was released in stores and online on November 6, 2007. Amongst the songs not available on the soundtrack but featured in the film are Muse's "Blackout", The Killers' "All These Things That I've Done", and Blur's "Tender". Additionally, tracks from Radiohead, Louis Armstrong, Beethoven, Kris Kristofferson, and several tracks from Moby's Hotel:Ambient are likewise absent from the album. The reason for the exclusion of some of these tracks, like the song by The Killers was as a result of a dispute with the record label.

The track "Memory Gospel" was used from time to time by the CBC Radio One program Q in the background of an opening monologue given by host Jian Ghomeshi.

Release

Marketing
Southland Tales was initially planned to be a nine-part "interactive experience", with the first six parts published in six 100-page graphic novels that would be released in a six-month period up to the film's release. The feature film comprises the final three parts of the experience. A website was also developed to intertwine with the graphic novels and the film itself. The idea of six graphic novels was later cut down to three. The novels were written by Kelly and illustrated by Brett Weldele. Kelly wrote them while making the film and found it very difficult as it pushed him "to the edge of my own sanity", as he remarked in an interview.
 Part One: Two Roads Diverge (May 25, 2006)
 Part Two: Fingerprints (September 15, 2006)
 Part Three: The Mechanicals (January 31, 2007)

They have been collected together into one single volume:
 Southland Tales: The Prequel Saga (360 pages, Graphitti Designs)

The titles of the parts in the film are:
 Part Four: Temptation Waits
 Part Five: Memory Gospel
 Part Six: Wave of Mutilation

Theatrical release

Following its May 21, 2006 premiere at the 2006 Cannes Film Festival, where it was poorly received, the final version of the film premiered at Fantastic Fest on September 22, 2007. The film was originally scheduled to be released in the United States on November 9, 2007, in partnership with Destination Films and Samuel Goldwyn Films, but in eventually opened in limited release in California on November 14, 2007. It opened in Canada, as well as nationwide in the United States, in just 63 theaters, on November 16, 2007. The film was released in the UK on December 7, 2007, exclusively to UK cinema chain Cineworld in a limited number of locations.

Home media
The Region 1 DVD was released on March 18, 2008, in North America and the Region 2 release was on March 31, 2008, in the United Kingdom. The film was released on Region 4 DVD in Australia on April 30, 2008. Special features include a 33-minute documentary USIDent TV: Surveiling the Southland and a 10-minute animated short film This Is the Way the World Ends (which was not included on the R2 and R4 editions). On March 25, 2009, the R2 DVD was released in France.

On September 8, 2008, it was announced that it would be one of the five films being released on Blu-ray on November 18, 2008. The only new special feature announced was an audio commentary by Kelly. On October 26, 2020, Arrow Video announced a Remastered version approved by Richard Kelly would released on Blu-ray on January 26, 2021. This release includes both the original theatrical cut and the Cannes cut.

Reception

Cannes Film Festival
Along with two other American filmmakers (Sofia Coppola's Marie Antoinette and Richard Linklater's Fast Food Nation), Kelly's follow-up to Donnie Darko was in competition for the coveted Palme d'Or at the 2006 Cannes Film Festival and was screened on May 21 at the Grand Lumiere Theater.

Many critics responded unfavorably to the film's long running time and sprawling nature. Roger Ebert described the Cannes screening as "The most disastrous since, yes, The Brown Bunny." Salon.com critic Andrew O'Hehir called the Cannes cut "about the biggest, ugliest mess I've ever seen." Jason Solomons, in The Observer (UK), said that "Southland Tales was so bad it made me wonder if [Kelly] had ever met a human being" and that ten minutes of the "sprawling, plotless, post-apocalyptic farrago" gave him the "sinking feeling that this may be one of the worst films ever presented in [Cannes] competition." A handful of the American and European critics, however, were more positive. The Village Voice critic J. Hoberman, for example, called Southland Tales "a visionary film about the end of times" comparable in recent American film only to David Lynch's  Mulholland Drive.

Critical response
41% of 106 reviews compiled by review aggregator Rotten Tomatoes are positive, and the average rating is 4.9 out of 10. The site's consensus states: "Southland Tales, while offering an intriguing vision of the future, remains frustratingly incoherent and unpolished." On Metacritic, the film has a score of 44 out of 100, based on 26 critics, indicating "mixed or average reviews".

Glenn Kenny, in his review for Premiere criticized the film's style, "Kelly's camera placement and framing are at best textbook and at worst calamitously mediocre." In her review for the Los Angeles Times, Carina Chocano wrote, "You get the sense that Kelly is too angry to really find any of it funny. It's easy to empathize with his position, not so easy to remain engrossed in a film that's occasionally inspired but ultimately manic and scattered." David Edelstein's review in New York magazine criticized the film's writing, "Kelly aims high and must have shot off his own ear, which is the only way to account for the dialogue."

On the program Ebert & Roeper, Richard Roeper and guest critic Michael Phillips gave the film a negative review. While Roeper called the film "Two hours and twenty-four minutes of abstract crap," Phillips felt that "the film has a head on its shoulders despite the fact that it can't find any direction" but nevertheless gave the film a thumbs down.

J. Hoberman defended the film, yet again, in his review for the theatrical cut. "In its willful, self-involved eccentricity, Southland Tales is really something else. Kelly's movie may not be entirely coherent, but that's because there's so much it wants to say." Manohla Dargis also gave the film a positive review in The New York Times, writing, "He doesn't make it easy to love his new film, which turns and twists and at times threatens to disappear down the rabbit hole of his obsessions. Happily, it never does, which allows you to share in his unabashed joy in filmmaking as well as in his fury about the times."

The film remains enigmatic to many viewers and even some of its makers. In a 2011 interview, Justin Timberlake himself said, "To me, Southland Tales is performance art. I still don't know what that movie is about." In 2013, Kelly said he considered this work as "the thing that I'm most proud of, and I feel like it's sort of the misunderstood child or the banished child."

Box office
Southland Tales grossed $275,380 in limited release at the North American box office and $99,363 in Turkey and United Kingdom for a worldwide total of $374,743, against a production budget of $17 million.

Future
In January 2021, Richard Kelly announced that developments are underway to expand the film into a franchise with intention being that the original cast return. The filmmaker explained that the original film is chapters 4-6, while a prequel project will explore chapters 1-3 with intentions being to do so through an animation medium; while additional projects can explore events that take place in 2024. He stated that discussions are ongoing as to whether the projects should be released as films or in a long-form format through a streaming service.

See also

 List of American films of 2007
 99 Francs
 A Scanner Darkly and its film adaptation

References

External links

 
 
 

2006 films
2006 black comedy films
2006 thriller films
2000s comedy thriller films
2000s dystopian films
2000s American films
2000s English-language films
2000s German films
American alternate history films
American black comedy films
American comedy thriller films
Apocalyptic films
English-language German films
Films about amnesia
Films about time travel
Films adapted into comics
Films directed by Richard Kelly
Films set in 2008
Films set in California
Films shot in Los Angeles
Films shot in New Jersey
German alternate history films
German black comedy films
German comedy thriller films
Independence Day (United States) films
Iraq War films
Metaphysical fiction films
Moby
Quantum fiction
Utopian films
Universal Pictures films